Giuseppe Panzi (潘廷章、1734–before 1812) was a Jesuit painter of the 18th and early 19th century, who worked in the service of the Qianlong Emperor of China. He was the last of the Western painters who worked for the Qianlong Emperor, together with Father Louis Antoine de Poirot (1735–1813). Giuseppe Panzi arrived in Beijing in 1773, where the two painters replaced the more famous father Giuseppe Castiglione and Jean-Denis Attiret.

See also
Jesuit China missions

Notes

References
Lorry Swerts, Mon Van Genechten, Koen De Ridder, Mon Van Genechten (1903-1974): Flemish Missionary and Chinese Painter : Inculturation of Chinese Christian Art, Leuven University Press, 2002  

18th-century Italian Jesuits
1734 births
19th-century deaths
18th-century Italian painters
Italian male painters
19th-century Italian painters
19th-century Italian male artists
18th-century Italian male artists